William F. Cogswell (July 15, 1819 – December 24, 1903) was a portrait painter who was born in Fabius, New York.  In the 1830s, while working in a color factory in Buffalo, New York, he taught himself to paint.  During the 1840s, he worked in New York City as a professional portrait artist.  He lived in California from 1873 on, with the exception of several trips to Hawaii between 1878 and 1897.  He died in Pasadena, California, on December 24, 1903.

Legacy
Cogswell is most noted for his portraits of Ulysses S. Grant, currently hanging in the United States Senate, and Abraham Lincoln, which hangs in the White House.  He also painted Hawaiian royalty, including King Kalākaua, Princess Liliuokalani, Queen Emma, King Kamehameha IV, and King Kamehameha V—the latter two from photographs.  The Bishop Museum (Honolulu), the Butler Institute of American Art (Youngstown, Ohio), the Crocker Art Museum (Sacramento, California), the Joslyn Art Museum (Omaha, Nebraska), the National Portrait Gallery (Washington, DC), the New York Historical Society, the Ohio Historical Society (Columbus, Ohio), the Haggin Museum (Stockton, California), the Indiana State Museum (Indianapolis), the White House, the Union League Club of Chicago, and the Mabel Tainter Theater in Menomonie, Wisconsin, are among the public collections holding paintings by William Cogswell.

Gallery

Footnotes

References
New York Historical Society, Dictionary of Artists in America, New Haven, Yale University Press, 1957.
Severson, Don R. Finding Paradise: Island Art in Private Collections, University of Hawaii Press, 2002, pp. 80–81.
Collection of works

External links
obituary
bio
bio

1819 births
1903 deaths
Artists from Pasadena, California
19th-century American painters
American male painters
20th-century American painters
People from Fabius, New York
Burials at Evergreen Cemetery, Los Angeles
19th-century American male artists
20th-century American male artists